Émile Mauchamp or Pierre Benoit Émile Mauchamp (3 March 1870, in Chalon-sur-Saône, Saône-et-Loire – 19 March 1907, in Marrakesh, Morocco) was a French doctor assassinated by a mob in Marrakesh, near the pharmacy where he practiced. He was characterized as a "martyr to civilization" in the French press; his death, an "unprovoked and indefensible attack from the barbarous natives of Morocco." His death was taken as a pretext by Hubert Lyautey and his forces in taking Oujda, marking the beginning of the French conquest of Morocco.

Biography 
Émile Mauchamp was the son of a politician who was the counselor general of Chalon-sur-Saône. After his studies in collège, he left for Paris to study medicine. He was named a marine medical officer and practiced in a number of countries: Portugal, Brazil, Italy, Greece, Russia, and Turkey.

Morocco 
After a journey to Jerusalem, he was chosen by decree of the minister of foreign affairs to go to Morocco and run a pharmacy created in Marrakesh in 1905.

Assassination 
He was assassinated near the pharmacy on March 19, 1907. He was accused of having "pernicious Christian objectives."

Funeral 
Émile Mauchamp was given a national funeral and was awareded the medal of the Legion of Honour posthumously.

His funeral on April 11, 1907, was attended by a massive crowd including several political figures such as the French Minister of Foreign Affairs Stephen Pichon. Mauchamp's casket arrived at the station of Chalon-sur-Saône at 9 am, draped in the French flag. His coffin was displayed on a catafalque placed in front of the town hall. No fewer than 7 speeches were made. The funeral procession then headed to the Cemetery of the East; shopkeepers lowered their curtains. He was interred in the intimacy of his family, but the citizens had an opportunity to pay their last respects.

Monuments 
A bronze sculpture by Pierre Curillon placed in Chabas Square in the memory of Dr. Émile Mauchamp was inaugurated on August 21, 1910. The statue features a Moroccan woman extending an arm toward the doctor while holding her son in the other arm. German soldiers stole the statue in World War II. A road in Chalon-sur-Saône leading toward the old prison still bears his name.

Bibliography 
 .
 
 Robert Tatheraux, Émile Mauchamp : la vie généreuse et la fin tragique d'un médecin chalonnais, revue « Images de Saône-et-Loire » n° 56 (Noël 1983), pp. 17–19.

References

French murder victims
20th-century French physicians
People murdered in Morocco
1870 births
1907 deaths
19th-century French physicians
20th-century Moroccan physicians